Semantic search denotes search with meaning, as distinguished from lexical search where the search engine looks for literal matches of the query words or variants of them, without understanding the overall meaning of the query. Semantic search seeks to improve search accuracy by understanding the searcher's intent and the contextual meaning of terms as they appear in the searchable dataspace, whether on the Web or within a closed system, to generate more relevant results. Content that ranks well in semantic search is well-written in a natural voice, focuses on the user's intent, and considers related topics that the user may look for in the future.

Some authors regard semantic search as a set of techniques for retrieving knowledge from richly structured data sources like ontologies and XML as found on the Semantic Web. Such technologies enable the formal articulation of domain knowledge at a high level of expressiveness and could enable the user to specify their intent in more detail at query time.

See also
List of Semantic Search Engines
Semantic web
Semantic Unification
Resource Description Framework
Natural language search engine
Semantic Query

References

External links
 Semantic Search 2008 Workshop at ESWC'08
 Workshop on Exploiting Semantic Annotations in Information Retrieval at ECIR'08.

Internet search engines
Semantic Web
Information retrieval genres

de:Semantische Suche